HMLTD are an English art punk band from London, formed in 2015. The band currently consists of lead vocalist Henry Spychalski, guitarists James Donovan and Duc Peterman, bassist Nico Mohnblatt, drummer Achilleas Sarantaris and keyboardist Seth Evans.

Background 
HMLTD formed in London as Happy Meal Ltd. in early 2015.  Singer Henry Chisholm goes under the pseudonym 'Henry Spychalski', and was born and raised in Torquay before moving to London.  Spychalski met Duc, who had played in a band with Nico in Paris, at a bar in London which helped foster a friendship and the formation of the band.  James originates from Ipswich and shared a house in Elephant and Castle with friends including Henry.  Zac, from Bristol, met Duc through Reddit and "less vile corners" of 4chan, and Vincent from Hong Kong; when he returned home in late 2015 he was replaced by Achilleas, originally from Athens. Late in 2019, Zac left the band to focus on his education, he was replaced by Seth Evans, a friend of the band, who they met in London.

HMLTD has been criticised for allegedly appropriating queer and/or gender bender aesthetics as heterosexual men, including cross-dressing, make-up, and flamboyant performances.  According to Spychalski, the band is "trying to challenge toxic masculinity and we’re doing that from the perspective we can do that from, as the human beings we were born into being, which is predominantly straight cis men. But I don’t think having that role should exclude or prohibit you from taking on that political perspective and from taking on what is probably the most violent, toxic, cruel force in our society. We’re learning from queer methods and we always try to express that indebtedness.”

Their image and sound can be seen as influenced by the Ziggy Stardust era of David Bowie and the New Romantic period in the 1980s. Their sound has been compared to a wide range of acts such as The Prodigy and Peaches. They have also been regarded as avant-garde for their infusion of EDM and experimental pop with their guitar-oriented sound.

On 20 July 2018, HMLTD released their debut EP, Hate Music Last Time Delete.  Pictures Of You was written with Justin Tranter.
On 7 February 2020, HMLTD released their debut studio album West of Eden. According to lead singer Henry Spychalski, the album took almost four years to create, due to the interspersed writing as every member was in university education. The album tour swiftly followed the release, spanning the length of the UK, as well as various European cities.

Discography

Studio albums
West of Eden (2020)
The Worm (2023)

EPs
Hate Music Last Time Delete (2018)
Don't Leave Me (2021)

Singles
"Stained" / "Is This What You Wanted?" (2016)
"To The Door" / "Music!" (2017)
"Satan, Luella & I" / "Kinkakuji" (2017)
"Death Drive" (2018)
"Flex" (feat. Xvoto.Delete) (2018)
”LOADED” (2019)
”The West Is Dead” (2019)
"Why?" (2019)
"Blank Slate" (2020)
”Wyrmlands” (2023)
”The End Is Now” (2023)

References

External links
 Official Website

Musical groups established in 2015
English glam rock groups
English pop rock music groups
RCA Records artists
2015 establishments in England